Tropidosaura is a genus of wall lizards of the family Lacertidae. The genus is endemic to southern Africa.

Geographic range
All species in the genus Tropidosaura are found in southern Africa.

Species
The following four species are recognized.
Tropidosaura cottrelli (Hewitt, 1925) – Cottrell's mountain lizard
Tropidosaura essexi Hewitt, 1927 – Essex's mountain lizard
Tropidosaura gularis Hewitt, 1927 – Cape mountain lizard, yellow-striped mountain lizard
Tropidosaura montana (Gray, 1831) – common mountain lizard, green-striped mountain lizard

Nota bene: A binomial authority in parentheses indicates that the species was originally described in a genus other than Tropidosaura.

References

Further reading
Fitzinger LI (1826). Neue Classification der Reptilien nach ihren natürlichen Verwandtschaften. Nebst einer Verwandtschaft-tafel und einem Verzeichnisse der Reptilien-Sammlung des K. K. Zoologischen Museums zu Wien. Vienna: J.G. Heubner. 5 unnumbered + 67 pp. + one plate. (Tropidosaura, new genus, p. 22). (in German).

 
Lizard genera
Taxa named by Leopold Fitzinger